Paul Theisen (born 15 June 1922) is a Danish fencer. He competed in the team sabre event at the 1952 Summer Olympics.

References

External links
  

1922 births
Possibly living people
Danish male sabre fencers
Olympic fencers of Denmark
Fencers at the 1952 Summer Olympics
Sportspeople from Copenhagen